Navy Bound is a 1951 American drama film directed by Paul Landres and written by Samuel Roeca. The film stars Tom Neal, Wendy Waldron, Regis Toomey, John Abbott, Murray Alper and Paul Bryar. The film was released on March 4, 1951, by Monogram Pictures.

Plot

Cast           
Tom Neal as Joe Morelli
Wendy Waldron as Lisa
Regis Toomey as Capt. Charles Danning
John Abbott as Pappa Cerrano
Murray Alper as Chris 'Warthog' Novak
Paul Bryar as Robert Garrells
Harvey Parry as Dan Sweeney
Ric Roman as Tony Cerrano
John Compton as Vincent Cerrano
Stephen S. Harrison as Pietro Cerrano
Billy Bletcher as Schott
Ray Kemper as Sailor

See also
 Army Bound

References

External links
 

1951 films
American drama films
1951 drama films
Monogram Pictures films
Films directed by Paul Landres
American black-and-white films
1950s English-language films
1950s American films